Henry Lai Wan-man is a Chinese film composer based in Hong Kong who created the original score for more than 50 films.

Education 
Henry Lai finished his high school in Pui Ching Middle School (Hong Kong) and Repton School ( Derbyshire, UK). He acquired his degree in architecture at the University of Hong Kong.

Career 
Lai started his music career in a band, but it was disbanded. Lai also joined "Island", a band which he wrote original songs. Lai plays a classical guitar.
In 1994, Lai started scoring music for films.
Lai has composed music for film directors such as Daniel Lee, Mabel Cheung, and Dante Lam.

Filmography 

The Kung Fu Scholar (1993)
Thanks for Your Love (1996)
Moonlight Express (1999)
A Fighter's Blues (2000)
Beijing Rocks (2001)
Just One Look (2002)
Traces of a Dragon (2003)
Star Runner (2003)
Dragon Squad (2005)
B420 (2005)
My Name Is Fame (2006)
Beast Stalker (2008)
The Sniper (2009)
Three Kingdoms: Resurrection of the Dragon (2009)
Black Ransom (2010)
14 Blades (2010)
Echoes of the Rainbow (2010)
Fire of Conscience (2010)
The Stool Pigeon (2010)
The Lost Bladesman (2011)
White Vengeance (2011)
The Four (2012)
The Stolen Years (2013)
Unbeatable (2013)
Balala the Fairies: The Magic Trial (2014)
Old Boys: The Way of the Dragon (2014)
A Tale of Three Cities (2015)
To the Fore (2015)
Dragon Blade (2015)
Yesterday Once More (2016)
Kill Time (2016)
Time Raiders (2016)
Operation Mekong (2016) 
The Climbers (2019) 
Matteo Ricci The Musical (2019)- music composer.

’’Tom Clancy’s Ghost Recon 2’’(2004) Video Game PS2/Gamecube

Awards and nominations

References

External links
Java Music Productions

 Henry Lai Discography at cduniverse.com

Living people
Hong Kong film score composers
Hong Kong male composers
Male film score composers
Year of birth missing (living people)